Furzi, also known as Vibor and CBM Fast-Gaggia, was an Italian professional cycling team that existed from 1974 to 1979.

The team competed in 6 consecutive editions of the Giro d'Italia, having entered each year of its existence.

Major wins
1975
 Giro di Toscana, Tino Conti
1977
 Giro d'Italia
Stage 2b & 22, Luciano Borgognoni
Stage 19, Renato Laghi
1978
 Giro d'Italia
 Stage 17, Wladimiro Panizza
 Young rider classification, Roberto Visentini

References

Defunct cycling teams based in Italy
1974 establishments in Italy
1979 disestablishments in Italy
Cycling teams established in 1974
Cycling teams disestablished in 1979